Sergei Sergeevich Smirnov (16 September 1895 (New Style) — 20 August 1947) was a Soviet geologist and mineralogist, academician of the Soviet Academy of Sciences (1943).

The ridge Dorsa Smirnov on the Moon was named after him.

1895 births
1947 deaths
Full Members of the USSR Academy of Sciences
Soviet geologists